Auto-B-Good is a 2005-2006 American animated series. The series features short stories set in the fictional City of Auto, in which all the citizens are cars. The program is explicitly designed to teach children lessons in moral character and values. Auto-B-Good was produced by Wet Cement Productions. The show was shown on certain PBS stations on PBS Kids before moving to Smile of a Child/TBN until early 2019.

Characters

Main
Johnny
Model: 2003 Dodge Viper
Johnny is cool and daring. He loves high speeds and a glossy shine. His best friends are Derek, Cali, Maria, and Miles. His favorite thing to do is race to Squeakies Car Wash to get “squeaky clean” and show off his shine.

Cali
Model: 1999 Mercedes-Benz R170
Cali is a valley girl. She hangs out with Johnny and Maria and loves shopping.
  
EJ
Model: 1974 Morris Mini
One of the “little cars,” Eric Jacobson "EJ" Mini puts his all into everything he does. He tries hard to keep up with the big guys and wants to be just like Johnny when he grows up. His best friend is his classmate Izzi.

Issadora
Model: 1957 BMW Isetta 300
Issadora (Izzi) is an innocent, bright-eyed, and curious 7-year-old who loves to play with EJ, but can get frustrated at being the littlest and not always able to do what the others can.
 
Professor
Model: 1950 Citroën 2CV
Professor's inventions would be world-renowned, except they usually go awry. He is a bit eccentric and very analytical but has a heart of gold that makes him beloved by all.

Franklin
Model: 1931 Tatra T80
Old and wise, Franklin has lived a full life and speaks from experience to give advice on almost anything. He and the Professor are good friends and both act as mentors to the “kids.”

Miles
Model: 1970 Volkswagen Karmann Ghia
Miles is the conscience of the group who knows what's right and tries to steer the others in that direction. Miles' maturity gives a balance to the friendship with Johnny and Cali.

Maria
Model: 2003 Jeep Liberty
With her love of adventure and four-wheeling, Maria is the trailblazer of the group. She coaches the little cars' soccer team and has a job at the park. Maria is friends with Derek.

Derek
Model: 2000 Dodge Ram
Derek is the biggest and toughest of the group. With his mild manner and gentle spirit, Derek is often the group's peacemaker and mediator.

Minor
Elrod
Model: 1923 Austin 7
Century-old Elrod fight in the great war with CJ Willy, Franklin, and Mr. Morgan. He lived alone for many years after the war and later reconciled with his friends. He currently is the owner and operator of Elrod's Mini Golf.

CJ Willy
Model: 1942 Willys MB
Franklin, Mr. Morgan, and Elrod's drill instructor and sergeant in charge during the great war. Lost his life in the line of duty. His image is cast in bronze as the statue in Memorial Park.

Lug Nut
Model: 1934 Triumph Dolomite
A vaudeville performer who, along with his comedy partner, Dip Stick, teaches Miles that enthusiasm is the secret of success.

Billy
Billy was lost in the wilderness at a young age and was raised by Big Horns. When the other cars found him on a camping trip, they brought him back to the City of Auto and learned to see all the wonderful things in their city through new eyes.

Mr. Morgan

 Model: 1939 BMW 328

Mr. Morgan is the sports referee.

Cast 
 Charles Hubbell as Johnny
 Heidi Fellner as Cali 
 Teri Parker-Brown as Maria 
 Jim Cunningham as Derek 
 Kim Kivens as EJ
 Sabrina Crews as Izzi 
 Dave Simmons as Miles (same voice used for Noils in Ewe Know) 
 John Farrell as Franklin
 Len Goodman as Professor

Episodes
The first season consisted of 36 episodes, each focusing on a particular character trait.

Season 1 (2005)

Season 2 (2006)
Wet Cement completed 27 episodes for the second season.

DVD Versions
Auto-B-Good DVDs come in three versions: a retail version for home audiences, an education version used in school classrooms across the country and a Special Edition with Christian music videos featuring the music of Rick Altizer that enhance the positive character lessons with a spiritual application.

Storybooks
In 2009, Rising Star Studios produced six kids' storybooks, written by Phillip Walton. Each is an original story focusing on lessons in trustworthiness, respect, caring, responsibility, citizenship and fairness.

 EJ and the Bully (a lesson in Respect)
 Queen for a Day (a lesson in Fairness)
 Citizen Miles (a lesson in Citizenship)
 Sticking to it! (a lesson in Trustworthiness)
 Mean Ole Crankfender (a lesson in Caring)
 Attack of the Runaway Robot (a lesson in Responsibility)

References

External links
 
 Rising Star Education
 Auto-B-Good on Facebook
 Auto-B-Good on Twitter
 Auto-B-Good on YouTube
 Auto-B-Good Light TV 33 PHL Program Description

2005 American television series debuts
2006 American television series endings
2000s American animated television series
American children's animated adventure television series
American children's animated education television series
American children's animated fantasy television series
American children's animated sports television series
American computer-animated television series
Christian animation
Christian children's television series
English-language television shows
PBS Kids shows
PBS original programming
Animated television series about auto racing